Covenant College, formerly known as Geelong Christian School, is a Christian parent-controlled school in Bell Post Hill, Victoria.

Established  in  1979, the  school's  programs are  academic. The  college  owns  a  farm and  conducts  agricultural and land  management  classes.  It  is  an  inclusive  school  and  promotes both  tolerance  and  acceptance of  others in its  teachings; the  college is  committed to the "social value of respect for all persons"  and supports   children  of  all  faiths  and those who  respect, but  may  not  adhere  to,  any   religious  belief. In 2019, Covenant College was named the Schools that Excel non-government school winner for regional and rural Victoria.

References

Educational institutions established in 1979
1979 establishments in Australia
Private primary schools in Victoria (Australia)
Private secondary schools in Victoria (Australia)
Nondenominational Christian schools in Victoria (Australia)
Schools in Geelong